Happy Town is an American drama television series that premiered on ABC on Wednesday, April 28, 2010, and ended on June 16, 2010. It was created by Josh Appelbaum, Andre Nemec, and Scott Rosenberg. It had a total of eight episodes, but only six was broadcast on ABC. The remaining two, "Dallas Alice Doesn't Live Here Anymore" and the series finale, "Blame It on Rio Bravo", were available for viewing only at the network's website on July 1, 2010.

Plot
A period of peace following a series of unsolved kidnappings is cut short when a new crime has everyone talking in the small Minnesota town of Haplin. The townsfolk are convinced the crimes are committed by the so-called "Magic Man", a person whom character Merritt Grieves describes as having "an ability to make people disappear that bordered on the mystical". Seven people have vanished, never to be heard from again.

As the series progresses, it seems evident that the disappearances are related to an old German film titled Die Blaue Tür (The Blue Door).

Background
Although the series is set in Minnesota, many of the scenes for the program's pilot and first season were filmed in Canadian communities such as Port Hope, Penetanguishene, St. Catharines and Brampton, all in Ontario. Several of the street level shots were filmed in Newnan, GA.

After shooting the pilot episode, actor Ben Schnetzer replaced John Patrick Amedori in the role of Andrew Haplin, and Steven Weber replaced Dean Winters for the role of John Haplin.

Cast and characters
 Geoff Stults as Deputy Tommy Conroy
 Lauren German as Henley Boone/"Chloe"
 Amy Acker as Rachel Conroy
 Robert Ray Wisdom as Detective Roger Hobbs
 Sarah Gadon as Georgia Bravin
 Sam Neill as Merritt Grieves
 Peter Outerbridge as Dan Farmer
 Jay Paulson as Deputy Eli "Root Beer" Rogers
 Steven Weber as John Haplin
 Warren Christie as Aidan "Greggy" Stiviletto
 Lynne Griffin as Dot Meadows
 Ben Schnetzer as Andrew Haplin

Recurring cast
 Sophia Ewaniuk as Emma Conroy
 M. C. Gainey as Sheriff Griffin Conroy
 Frances Conroy as Peggy Haplin
 Natalie Brown as Carol Haplin
 Abraham Benrubi as Big Dave Duncan
 David Cronenberg as Dr. Leichman
 Stephen McHattie as Carl Bravin
 Dee Wallace as Alice Conroy
 Joanna Douglas as Officer Shell Jenkins
 Steve Arbuckle as Baby Boy Stiviletto

Episodes

Ratings
Despite a promotional push from ABC, its debut episode performed poorly, scoring a 1.7/5 among 18-49's, with 5.2 million viewers overall, roughly scoring the same numbers in the same time period that predecessors Ugly Betty and Eastwick had during their run. In its second outing, the ratings slipped as did its audience, scoring a 1.2/4 among 18-49's and a 2.6/5 overall with 3.8 million viewers watching.

On May 11, 2010, ABC announced that it was pulling Happy Town from the schedule for two weeks, planning to resume its episode run on June 2; with the 5 remaining episodes airing on consecutive weeks. On May 17, 2010, ABC confirmed that Happy Town was among the shows cancelled from the 2009–2010 season. On June 18, 2010, ABC officially cancelled the series after its June 16, 2010 episode aired. On July 1, 2010, ABC.com released the two remaining episodes online.

Ratings chart

References

External links

 
 Happy Town on TVSA

American Broadcasting Company original programming
2010s American drama television series
2010 American television series debuts
2010 American television series endings
English-language television shows
2010s American horror television series
2010s American mystery television series
Television shows filmed in Ontario
Television shows set in Minnesota
Television series created by Josh Appelbaum and André Nemec
Television series by ABC Studios
Television shows filmed in Georgia (U.S. state)